The Festival Vues dans la tête de... is a Canadian film festival, staged annually in Rivière-du-Loup, Quebec. Held at the city's Cinéma Princesse over one weekend in February each year, the festival selects one filmmaker each year to serve as a patron and programmer; the festival typically opens with one of the lead filmmaker's own films, with the program for the rest of the weekend consisting of a selection of other narrative, documentary and short films by Quebec filmmakers, selected by the lead filmmaker to provide various perspectives on a theme of interest.

Filmmakers
Hugo Latulippe (2013)
Sébastien Pilote (2014)
Stéphane Lafleur (2015)
Micheline Lanctôt (2016)
Anne Émond (2017)
Francis Leclerc (2018)
Kim Nguyen (2019)
Myriam Verreault (2020)
Jeanne Leblanc (2021)
Maxime Giroux (2022)
Robert Morin (2023)

References

External links

Film festivals in Quebec
Rivière-du-Loup
Film festivals established in 2013
2013 establishments in Quebec